Karnack Independent School District is a public school district based in the community of Karnack, Texas (USA).

In addition to Karnack, the district also serves the city of Uncertain.

Academic achievement
In 2009, the school district was rated "academically acceptable" by the Texas Education Agency.

Schools
Karnack Junior/Senior High (Grades 7-12) High school grades discontinued in 2015.
George Washington Carver Elementary (Grades PK-6)

See also

List of school districts in Texas 
List of high schools in Texas

References

External links
Karnack ISD
2006 Texas Legislative Budget Board report on Karnack Independent School District

School districts in Harrison County, Texas